Tetla de la Solidaridad is a municipality in Tlaxcala in south-eastern Mexico.

References

Municipalities of Tlaxcala